Love Comes Lately is a 2007 film written for the screen and directed by Jan Schütte. The film is based on the short stories of Isaac Bashevis Singer.

Plot
Elderly Jewish writer Max Kohn (Otto Tausig) is an Austrian émigré whose mind is constantly working causing a state of perpetual confusion. He's a successful author of short stories who lives in New York City and is so stuck in his old ways that he believes that the only proper way to write is by using a typewriter. Max has several women interested in seducing him, but he spends most of his time with fellow worrier Reisel (Rhea Perlman). During a trip to speak in nearby Hanover Max begins editing his latest story—a wild tale of a Miami retiree who gets himself into various kinds of trouble. It doesn't take Max long to lose himself in his own writings, and pretty soon, he's mixed up in two sexy romances and an unsolved murder.

Upon returning to reality, Max begins to feel as if his own written words have begun to manifest themselves. A meeting with burned out former student Rosalie (Barbara Hershey), with whom he shares a mutual attraction, follows, and later while heading to Springfield for another unwanted speaking engagement Max discovers that he has lost the speech he prepared. After a series of small adventures, Max decides to start writing a new story based on his recent life and featuring a protagonist named Harry—a thinly veiled stand-in for himself.

Principal Cast
 Otto Tausig as Max Kohn
 Rhea Perlman as Reisel
 John C. Vennema as Dr. Grosskopf
 Olivia Thirlby as Sylvia Brokeles
 Tovah Feldshuh as Ethel
 Bunny Levine as M.N.
 Brian Doyle-Murray as The Boss
 Elizabeth Peña as Esperanza
 Barbara Hershey as Rosalie
 Gurdeep Singh as H.P.
 Lee Wilkof as Professor Meyer

Reception
The film received a score of 70% on Rotten Tomatoes, indicating pretty good reviews.

From Nathan Lee at The New York Times:

From Wesley Morris at The Boston Globe:

From Ruthe Stein at San Francisco Chronicle:

References

External links 
 
 
 

2007 films
Austrian comedy-drama films
English-language Austrian films
English-language German films
Films about writers
Films based on works by Isaac Bashevis Singer
Films based on short fiction
Films set in New York City
Films shot in Florida
Films shot in New York (state)
Films shot in New Hampshire
German comedy-drama films
Films about Jews and Judaism
Films directed by Jan Schütte
Films based on multiple works
2000s English-language films
American comedy-drama films
2000s American films
2000s German films